Misty Thursday is an album led by pianist Duke Jordan recorded in 1975 and released on the Danish SteepleChase label.

Reception

AllMusic awarded the album 3 stars.

Track listing
All compositions by Duke Jordan except as indicated
 "There's a Star for You" - 6:28
 "Hymn to Peace" - 4:51
 "Misty Thursday" - 5:56
 "Night Train from Snekkersten" - 6:20
 "Jealous Blues" - 5:31
 "Lady Linda" - 7:46
 "I'm Gonna Learn Your Style" - 8:55
 "Hymn to Peace" [Alternate Take] - 4:21 Bonus track on CD release
 "Night Train from Snekkersten" [Alternate Take] - 5:33 Bonus track on CD release

Personnel
Duke Jordan - piano
Chuck Wayne - guitar
Sam Jones - bass 
Roy Haynes - drums

References

1976 albums
Duke Jordan albums
SteepleChase Records albums